Rudolf Carl Ising (August 7, 1903 – July 18, 1992) was an American animator best known for collaborating with Hugh Harman to establish the Warner Bros. and MGM Cartoon studios during the early years of the golden age of American animation. In 1940, Ising produced William Hanna and Joseph Barbera's first cartoon, Puss Gets the Boot, a cartoon featuring characters later known as Tom and Jerry.

Personal life
Ising was born in Kansas City, Missouri on August 7, 1903.

He was married twice, first to Maxine Jennings between 1936 until their divorce in 1940, and later to Cynthia Westlake from 1941 until his death, with whom he had a son, Rudolf Ising, Jr.

Ising died of cancer in Newport Beach on 18 July 1992 and is buried at Pacific View Memorial Park in California.

Career
Ising spent his teenage years working at a photographic studio before joining Walt Disney's Laugh-O-Gram studio alongside other Kansas City youths. He soon became close friends with Hugh Harman, with whom he attempted to do a series of Arabian Nights-inspired cartoons after Disney left for Hollywood in the wake of the bankruptcy of his original studio before rejoining him in 1923 to work in his Alice Comedies. After Disney had a falling out with Charles Mintz over budgets in 1928, Ising, alongside most of the crew, opted to join the latter to continue the production of Disney's Oswald the Lucky Rabbit cartoons. 

Following Universal's terminating Mintz's contract in 1929, Ising and Harman created their own cartoon studio which made a brief audition film featuring Bosko, a character created by Harman. In this film, Ising portrays a cartoonist who draws Bosko, who constantly pesters him before being sent back into the inkwell. Soon thereafter, Harman-Ising Pictures gained a contract with Leon Schlesinger at Warner Bros. to produce cartoons beginning with 1930's Sinkin' in the Bathtub, which launched the Looney Tunes series. Ising eventually directed the first Merrie Melodies beginning in 1931, this being a series of heavily musical cartoons that initially featured recurring characters, the first of which, Foxy, bore such a resemblance to Mickey Mouse that Walt Disney asked Ising to stop using the character after three shorts. His voice was often featured on several of these early cartoons, mostly as deep-voiced villains or caricaturing celebrities of the era.

Budgetary disagreements severed Harman-Ising Pictures' relationship with Schlesinger by 1933, after which the company outsourced a number of cartoons for Van Beuren Studios. In 1934, they signed a contract with Metro-Goldwyn-Mayer to create a new series of cartoons under the Happy Harmonies moniker. Just like they had done at WB, Ising made one-shot musical comedies while Harman mostly directed shorts featuring a revamped Bosko. Ising's The Old Plantation, released in September 1935, was the first non-Disney cartoon filmed in the new three-strip Technicolor process after Disney's exclusive contract lapsed (not counting Ted Esbaugh's unreleased The Wizard of Oz cartoon in 1933).

MGM fired Harman and Ising in 1937 over money disputes, only to hire them back the following year after the failure of its in-house studio's first projects. As the duo's brand of cartoons featuring cutesy characters with light plots fell out of favor by the end of the 1930s, Ising opted to adapt with the times and created Barney Bear, based partly on himself, which first appeared in The Bear that Couldn't Sleep. Among those who worked in his unit were George Gordon, Mexican cartoonist Gus Arriola, Jerry Brewer, Bob Allen, and a recently-formed duo of animators, William Hanna and Joseph Barbera, whose first directoral foray, 1940's Puss Gets the Boot, which introduced the cat-and-mouse pair later known as Tom and Jerry, featured Ising as producer (being the only credited person in the short). He also produced The Milky Way that year, the first non-Disney cartoon to win an Academy Award for Best Cartoon Short Subject.

In 1942, Ising left MGM to join the Army Air Forces film unit as animation supervisor. After the war, he formed his own production company, hiring Hugh Harman in 1951 after his studio (formed after leaving Metro in 1941) folded, reestablishing Harman-Ising Studios.

His final major work was a failed TV pilot named Sir Gee Whiz on the Other Side of The Moon in 1960. Harman-Ising Studios closed in the early 1960s, after which Ising took to painting, mostly to give Harman, who endured dire financial straits, some financial support. After decades of relative obscurity, the now semi-retired Ising became a well-known name to animation fans through interviews made by Mark Kausler among other historians, also being honored by the International Animation Society In 1976.

See also
 Harman and Ising

Further reading 
 The Encyclopedia of Animated Cartoons by Jeff Lenburg, Checkmark Books (1999), page 131

References

External links 
 
 

1903 births
1992 deaths
American animators
American animated film directors
American animated film producers
Burials at Pacific View Memorial Park
20th-century American artists
Film directors from Missouri
Warner Bros. Cartoons people
Animators from Missouri
American people of German descent
Metro-Goldwyn-Mayer cartoon studio people
Disney people
Laugh-O-Gram Studio people
Deaths from cancer in California